The Battle of Mindouos was a battle fought between the Persians and Byzantines just after the battle of Thannuris (528). Procopius wrongly claimed that the two battles were one. The Byzantine commander Belisarius was ordered to build a fortress at the location. When Persian forces arrived in the area, his forces were routed in a battle on a nearby hill. As Belisarius was promoted shortly afterwards, it is likely that he was not seen as being responsible himself for his own defeat. It is possible but unlikely that Belisarius was not the overall commander of the Byzantine army, but a junior partner.

References

528
Mindouos
520s in the Byzantine Empire
6th century in Iran
Mindouos
Iberian War